Avelino may refer to:

Given name

Sports
 Avelino Acosta (1917–2008), Paraguayan football (soccer) player
 Avelino Asprilla (born 1981), former minor league baseball player
 Avelino Cañizares (1919–1983), former professional baseball shortstop
 Avelino Chaves (1931–2021), Spanish footballer
 Avelino Gomez (1928–1980), Cuban-born Hall of Fame jockey in American and Canadian thoroughbred horse racing
 Avelino Jackson Coelho (born 1986), known as Jajá Coelho, Brazilian football forward/midfielder
 Avelino Lopes (footballer) (born 1974), Angolan football player
 Avelino Martins (1905–?), Portuguese footballer
 Eduardo Avelino Magaña (born 1984), athlete from Mexico
 Julio Avelino Comesaña (born 1948), Uruguayan football manager and former Uruguayan footballer

Politics
 Andrés Avelino Cáceres (1836–1923), three times President of Peru during the 19th century
 Avelino Coelho da Silva, candidate in the Presidential Elections in East Timor in April 2007
 Avelino González-Claudio (born 1942), Puerto Rican independence activist who served time in a U.S. federal prison
 Avelino Méndez Rangel (born 1958), Mexican politician

Other people
 Avelino Arredondo, Uruguayan assassin
 Avelino Cachafeiro (1899–1972), Galician musician who played the gaita, the traditional Galician bagpipe
 Avelino Corma Canos (born 1951), Spanish chemist working on heterogeneous catalysis

Surname 
José Avelino (1890–1986), first President of the Senate of the Third Republic of the Philippines
Nuno Avelino (born 1976), Portuguese professional footballer, goalkeeper
Paulo Avelino (born 1988), Filipino television and film actor, model and singer

Stage name 
Avelino (rapper) (born 1993), English musician signed to Labrinth's Odd Child Recordings

Municipalities 
Pedro Avelino, municipality in the state of Rio Grande do Norte in the Northeast region of Brazil
Senador Georgino Avelino, municipality in the state of Rio Grande do Norte in the Northeast region of Brazil
Avelino Lopes, municipality in the state of Piauí in the Northeast region of Brazil

See also
Avelino Gomez Memorial Award, Canadian thoroughbred horse racing honour
Estádio Avelino Ferreira Torres, multi-use stadium in Marco de Canaveses, Portugal
Avelin
Avellino
Velino